Tabulaephorus is a genus of moths in the family Pterophoridae.

Species
Tabulaephorus afghanus (Arenberger, 1981)
Tabulaephorus decipiens (Lederer, 1870)
Tabulaephorus djebeli (Arenberger, 1981)
Tabulaephorus hissaricus (Zagulajev, 1986)
Tabulaephorus maracandicus Arenberger & Buchsbaum, 1998
Tabulaephorus marptys (Christoph, 1873)
Tabulaephorus murzini Gibeaux, 1997
Tabulaephorus narynus Arenberger, 1993
Tabulaephorus parthicus (Lederer, 1870)
Tabulaephorus punctinervis (Constant, 1885)
Tabulaephorus sesamitis (Meyrick, 1905)
Tabulaephorus thomasi Arenberger, 1993
Tabulaephorus ussuriensis (Caradja, 1920)

References 

Pterophorini
Moth genera